Joseph Frederick Wallet Des Barres  (22 November 1721 – 27 October 1824)< was a Canadian cartographer who served in the Seven Years' War, as the aide-de-camp to General James Wolfe. 

Des Barres is perhaps best known as the creator the monumental four-volume Atlantic Neptune, the most important collection of maps, charts and views of North America published in the eighteenth century. He later went on to serve as the Lieutenant-Governor of Cape Breton Colony and later as Lieutenant-Governor of Prince Edward Island.

Colonel Des Barres is buried with his wife under St. George's (Round) Church, Halifax, Nova Scotia.

Early life

Des Barres, who is seen as having lived through important changes in Nova Scotia's history, is thought to have been born in Basel, Switzerland (although Montbéliard has also been suggested), and was a member of a Huguenot family. His parents were Joseph-Leonard Vallet DesBarres and Anne-Catherine Cuvier and he was the eldest of their three children. Des Barres read mathematics and art at the University of Basel, studying under John and Daniel Bernoulli.  Upon the completion of his studies he left for England. There he enrolled at the Royal Military Academy, Woolwich. It was there that Des Barres trained to become a military officer, and studied military surveying. His training would also benefit him later in life for surveying, map making, and coastal charting. In 1756 he was commissioned into the Royal Americans (the 62nd Foot later known as the 60th Foot).

Seven Years' War

In 1756 Des Barres sailed to North America and was with Edward Boscawen's fleet when it attacked the Fortress of Louisbourg in 1758. He distinguished himself by capturing a French entrenchment at Kennington Cove. Soon he was put to work charting the Gulf of St. Lawrence and the approaches to Quebec, information that would be used the following year in James Wolfe's's assault on the City of Quebec. In 1760 he was at Halifax to prepare plans for the city's defences and naval yard.

Jonathan Binney and DesBarres met the Mi'kmaw chiefs at Arichat, Nova Scotia, in 1761, and concluded a lasting peace.

By 1762 he was sent to Newfoundland to survey Harbour Grace and Carbonear and to draw up plans for new harbour defences to replace those destroyed by the French. James Cook was sent as his assistant. (DesBarres may have met Cook earlier at either Louisbourg or Halifax.)

Castle Frederick
Des Barres established an  estate at Falmouth, Nova Scotia, known as Castle Frederick, which served as his base of operations from 1764 until he returned to England in 1773. The 1770 Nova Scotia census indicates Castle Frederick had a staff of 41 men, 13 women, 5 boys, and 33 girls. One of the women, Mary Cannon,
served as housekeeper and manager of Castle Frederick from 1764 to 1794. His Tatamagouche holdings formed the western coastal boundary of the Philadelphia grant.

Atlantic Neptune

Des Barres made many maps of the Atlantic, mapping the coast of North American from Newfoundland to New York. His survey of the coast of Nova Scotia took approximately ten years due its length and intricacy.  Des Barres was exasperated with the work, stating "There is scarcely any known shore so much intersected with Bays, Harbours, and Creeks as this is" "and the Offing of it is so full of Islands, Rocks, and Shoals as are almost innumerable." The survey work was carried out in the summer and in the winter he would retire to Castle Frederick to complete his charts and drawings.  His most notable work is the Atlantic Neptune.  In 1774 under direction for the British Admiralty, Des Barres compiled and edited his and many others' charts and maps of eastern North America.  The completed work was published in 1777, having cost the Admiralty an estimated £100,000.

Governor 

To accommodate the arrival of the United Empire Loyalists, Cape Breton was created as a separate colony from Nova Scotia (as was New Brunswick) and Des Barres served as the lieutenant governor of Cape Breton from 1784 to 1787. He laid out the original plan of the capital, Sydney. He was later governor of Prince Edward Island from 1804 to 1812. Dalhousie University has a number of items of Colonel Des Barres in one of its archive collections.

He died at the age of 102, and his date of death is variously given as 24 and 27 October. Colonel Des Barres is buried St. George's (Round) Church, Halifax, Nova Scotia.  While he was buried beside his wife Martha, he was survived by his mistress Mary Cannon and their four children. His funeral took place in St. George's Round Church in 1824.

Publications
 Atlantic Neptune (atlas of Eastern North America)

Legacy 
The following road is named after DesBarres:
 Des Barres St., Sydney, Nova Scotia

See also 
Military history of Nova Scotia
 List of cartographers

References

Further reading
 Stephen J. Horns. Surveyors of Empire: Samuel Holland, J.F.W. Des Barres, and the Making of The Atlantic Neptune. McGill/ Queen's University Press. 2011.
 LD Kernaghana. A Man and his Mistress: J.F.W. Des Barres and Mary Cannon. Acadiensis. 1981 
 Evans, G.N.D, Uncommon Obdurate: The several public careers of J. F. W. Des Barres, Boston/Toronto: Peabody Museum/University of Toronto Press, 1969
 Bird, Will, an Earl Must Have a Wife, Toronto: Clarke Irwin, 1969
 The Nova Scotia Historical Quarterly, Volume 5, Number 2, 1985, contains several articles about Des Barres:
Robert J, Morgan, "Des Barres the Founder"
Stephen B. MacPhee, "Des Barres and His Contemporary Mapmakers"
Douglas B. Foster, "Des Barres the Town Planner"
Lois K. Kernaghan, "'A Most Excentric Genius': The Private Life of J. F. W. Des Barres"
Mary Ellen Wright, "'You come late Monsieur le'Governor. Why you not come before?'"

External links

Archaeological excavations of his home, Castle Frederick
The Atlantic Neptune

1824 deaths
People from Basel-Stadt
Graduates of the Royal Military Academy, Woolwich
Swiss cartographers
Canadian cartographers
Canadian centenarians
Men centenarians
Swiss centenarians
Lieutenant Governors of Cape Breton Island
Swiss military engineers
Canadian military engineers
Persons of National Historic Significance (Canada)
Royal American Regiment officers
Lieutenant Governors of the Colony of Prince Edward Island
18th-century Swiss military personnel
19th-century Swiss military personnel
1720s births